Geummulsan  is a mountain in South Korea. Its area extends across Hoengseong, Gangwon-do and Yangpyeong County, Gyeonggi-do.

See also
 List of mountains in Korea

Notes

References
 

Mountains of South Korea
Mountains of Gangwon Province, South Korea
Mountains of Gyeonggi Province

zh:今勿山